E. Lorenz "Larry" Borenstein (1919–1981) was an American property owner, art dealer and the "Father of Preservation Hall".

He was born in Milwaukee, Wisconsin to Russian parents. At 13 years old he went to Chicago to join the World's Fair. After the fair he toured with a carnival for a while. By the age of 18, in the Summer of '37, he was peddling magazine subscriptions in Oklahoma and Texas clearing about $15,000 in 9 months. He put himself through Marquette University majoring in philosophy and working for the Milwaukee Sentinel. He was working for the American Vacation Association when he first arrived in New Orleans on the night of the attack on Pearl Harbor, December 7, 1941. His boss advised him that the war would not last more than a few months and to stick around and make some contacts. Borenstein never left.

Before he died in 1981, he owned several buildings in the French Quarter, had created the market for Pre-Columbian art in the United States by smuggling it from Mexico, and promoted little known artists into famous artists, such as Noel Rockmore as well as Sister Gertrude Morgan, who has been featured in the Smithsonian.

As the "Father of Preservation Hall", in 1955 he turned his art gallery  into a "rehearsal hall" for local musicians in his efforts to preserve the music. By 1961 his gallery had morphed into today's Preservation Hall. The Larry Borenstein Art Collection features artists from this era.

References

External links
 Vision Seekers on Sister Gertrude
 Al Rose, His Secret Life
 Preservation Hall Jazz Band
 Remembering Larry Borenstein and Preservation Hall

1919 births
1981 deaths
Businesspeople from Milwaukee
American art dealers
American people of Russian descent
Talent managers
20th-century American businesspeople